Benjamin Walsh (born July 4, 1979) is an American politician currently serving as the 54th Mayor of Syracuse New York, United States. Walsh assumed office on January 1, 2018 as the first independent mayor of Syracuse and the second without major party support since Louis Will in 1913.

Early life and education
Walsh is the son of former congressman James T. Walsh and grandson of former congressman and mayor of Syracuse, New York, William F. Walsh, both of whom represented Central New York as Republicans.

Walsh grew up as one of three children in the Strathmore neighborhood. He graduated from Westhill High School in 1997. Walsh attended Ithaca College and graduated with a Bachelor of Arts degree in Political Science. He also went on to attend Syracuse University, where he received a Master’s degree in Public Administration from the Maxwell School of Citizenship and Public Affairs.

Career
Walsh began his policy career working for Laborers Local 633, working on construction jobs around Onondaga Lake after his graduation from Ithaca College. Following this, he worked for the political actions staff for the American Federation of Labor and Congress of Industrial Organizations in Albany. In 2002, Walsh returned to Syracuse to run his fathers congressional campaign. Following his father’s campaign, Walsh traveled to Ireland, where he stayed for three months and interned for the Prime Minister of Ireland at the time, Bertie Ahern.

Walsh eventually returned to Syracuse to work at SUNY College of Environmental Science and Forestry educating municipalities about brownfields. He went on to become the deputy commissioner of the city's Department of Neighborhood and Business Development under previous mayor Stephanie Miner. Here, Walsh created the Greater Syracuse Land Bank and was part of the redevelopment of Hotel Syracuse. He also worked on the Metropolitan Development Association, a precursor to CenterState CEO. Additionally, Walsh served on several boards and community groups around Syracuse, including serving as president of the Gifford Foundation board.

After resigning from his position at city hall in 2015, Walsh worked for Mackenzie Hughes law firm as Business Development Director, prior to launching his campaign to become the mayor of Syracuse.

Mayor of Syracuse
Walsh was elected Mayor of Syracuse, NY in 2017 while running on two minor party lines, the Independence Party of New York and Reform Party of New York State. In what was generally seen as an upset, Ben Walsh defeated Democratic Party frontrunner Juanita Perez Williams. He won the election with 54% of the vote in what was a five candidate race, involving candidates from both major parties as well as the Green and Working Families Party.

Policy Plans 
In January 2019 Walsh introduced his major policy plan, Syracuse Surge, at that year's State of the City. The goal of this plan is to modernize Syracuse’s economy and prepare it for equitable access to new technology (as anticipated in projections in the Fourth Industrial Revolution) through both public and private investment.

The mayor's plans have included establishing a science, technology, engineering, arts and math (STEAM) school at the old Central Technical High School and is expected to open in the Fall of 2022.

In January 2020 Walsh announced the Resurgent Neighborhood Initiative (RNI), a plan for housing and economic development focused on ten neighborhoods and business corridors throughout the City of Syracuse.  The RNI plan is expected to add 200 new units of affordable housing to the city.  Despite the negative impact of the pandemic, progress on the program has continued.

Police Reform 
Police Reform has been a crucial part of Mayor Walsh Syracuse Police Reform Executive Order. This executive order includes the enacting of the Right to Know law which requires officers to give their name, rank and reason for stopping someone during every interaction with the public. The officers are required to leave their information if no arrest is made. Additionally the executive order includes equipping each patrol car with a dashboard camera, securing more body-worn cameras for patrol officers and new training guidelines such as education on the history of racism in Syracuse and the United States, among other things.

Attracting Public and Private Investment to Syracuse 
The city of Syracuse was awarded a $500,000 grant in the beginning of 2019 by the New York Power Authority to buy and replace all of the city’s streetlights with energy efficient light bulbs. The Walsh Administration claims the purchase is estimated to save the city $3 million per year and reduce greenhouse gas emissions by 6,100 tons.

On April 18, 2019, JP Morgan Chase selected Syracuse as one of five winners of its inaugural Advancing Cities Challenge, the city of Syracuse was awarded $3 million. This money is for improving tech sector jobs and not-for-profits in low or middle income neighborhoods with the overall goal of training young people, veterans, and people of color for future careers.

In April, 2021, Amazon donated $1.75 million to the STEAM school at Central Tech in order to further increase access to tech education in the city.

Syracuse's Columbus Monument 
Ben Walsh worked with InterFaith Works, a local charity, to lead community discussions on Syracuse's Christopher Columbus monument in 2018 and 2019. In 2020 he established a formal advisory council, the Columbus Circle Action Group, to consider ways to modify Columbus Circle. That group put forth a number of ideas, but in its report stopped short of suggesting that the statue should be removed. Nonetheless, on October 9, 2020, Syracuse Mayor Ben Walsh announced he decided to remove the statue and other parts of the statuary from the Monument and send the statue of Columbus to an unidentified “private location.”  In response, the Columbus Monument Corporation and 27 Syracuse taxpayers sued the City and Mayor on May 16, 2021 to stop the plan.  The petitioners maintained that the Monument was privately paid for, that private funds were integral to the Monumet's renovation by the City in 1992, and that Walsh lacked the legal authority under City law and a 1990’s contract with the State to remove the Monument or any part of it. On March 11, 2022, Supreme Court Justice Gerard Neri granted the petition in part, finding that the City has a legal duty to maintain the Monument in its current form and place and that the Columbus Monument Corporation was a third-party beneficiary of the City’s contract with the State, a contract in which the City promised to maintain the Monument on a long-term basis. Mayor Walsh immediately announced that the City would appeal Justice Neri’s decision. As of now, there is no date for the appeal to be heard.

Electoral history

References

External links
Biography on Syracuse website
Profile on Walsh from The Post-Standard

1979 births
Living people
21st-century American politicians
New York (state) Independents
Mayors of Syracuse, New York
Maxwell School of Citizenship and Public Affairs alumni
Ithaca College alumni